Hendecourt may refer to two communes in the Pas-de-Calais department in northern France:
 Hendecourt-lès-Cagnicourt
 Hendecourt-lès-Ransart